Jack William Frederick Gwillim (15 December 1909 – 2 July 2001) was an English character actor.

Career
Born in Canterbury, Kent, England, he joined the Royal Navy at 17 and served for over twenty years, becoming one of the youngest men ever to obtain the rank of Commander. During his time in the Navy, he became a champion boxer and rugby player, and was invalided out in 1946. After training at Central School of Speech and Drama, Gwillim began his acting career in earnest in the 1950s, working on both stage and screen. On stage, he appeared both at the Shakespeare Memorial Theatre in Stratford and at the Old Vic. He performed in an extensive amount of theatre, both classics and modern plays, in the West End of London and on Broadway.

Some of his most notable roles include: playing in Sir Ralph Richardson's production of The Merchant of Venice; The Right Honourable Gentleman with lifelong friend Anthony Quayle; a revival of My Fair Lady with Rex Harrison, playing Colonel Pickering; John Gielgud's The Constant Wife, with Ingrid Bergman; and The Iceman Cometh, with James Earl Jones.

Gwillim also featured in over fifty films and television series, usually war films or historical epics. His military background, commanding presence and deep, booming voice typecast him as soldiers and authority figures. Some of his most notable roles include playing a warship captain in Sink the Bismarck! (1960), the archbishop Hubert Walter in Sword of Sherwood Forest (1960), the obnoxious club secretary in Lawrence of Arabia (1962), King Aeëtes in Jason and the Argonauts (1963), an RAF officer in the James Bond film Thunderball (1965), the Lord Chief Justice in A Man for All Seasons (1966), General Harold Alexander in Patton (1970), Poseidon in Clash of the Titans (1981), and Van Helsing in The Monster Squad (1987). He also had a recurring role on the TV series Danger Man, The Saint, and The Troubleshooters.

He took part in a number of recordings for Caedmon Shakespeare Records.

Personal life
Gwillim was twice married: to Peggy Bollard, until 1958, and Olivia Selby, from 1969 until his death. He had two children from his first marriage, Sarah-Jane Gwillim and David Gwillim, and a third, Jaxon Duff Gwillim, from his second marriage. His children also became actors, and he acted onstage with them in 1995 in a production of On Borrowed Time, which was his last on stage performance.

Death
Gwillim died in Los Angeles, California on 2 July 2001 at the age of 91. He was buried in Lot 136, Section 15 of Albany Rural Cemetery in Upstate New York.

Filmography

 The Battle of the River Plate (1956) - Captain Parry - H.M.N.Z.S. Achilles
 The One That Got Away (1957) - Commandant Grizedale
 A Midsummer Night's Dream (1959) - Oberon (voice)
 North West Frontier (1959) - Brigadier Ames
 Solomon and Sheba (1959) - Josiah
 Sink the Bismarck! (1960) - Captain (King George V)
 Let's Get Married (1960) - Dr. Sanders
 Circus of Horrors (1960) - Supt. Andrews
 Oscar Wilde (1960) - Barrister
 Sword of Sherwood Forest (1960) - Archbishop of Canterbury Hubert Walter
 Sentenced for Life (1960) - John Richards
 No Love for Johnnie (1961) - MP (uncredited)
 Lisa (1962) - Insp. Cobb
 In Search of the Castaways (1962) - Captain Grant
 Lawrence of Arabia (1962) - Club Secretary
 The Rivals (1963) - Rolf Neilson
 Sammy Going South (1963) - District Commissioner
 Jason and the Argonauts (1963) - King Aeëtes
 The World Ten Times Over (1963) - Bolton
 The Curse of the Mummy's Tomb (1964) - Sir Giles Dalrymple
 Thunderball (1965) - Senior RAF Staff Officer (uncredited)
 Kiss the Girls and Make Them Die (1966) - British ambassador
 A Man for All Seasons (1966) - Chief Justice
 Casino Royale (1967) - British Officer at Auction (uncredited)
 The Bushbaby (1969) - Ardsley
 Battle of Britain (1969) - Senior Air Staff Officer
 Patton (1970) - General Sir Harold Alexander
 Cromwell (1970) - General Byron
 The Adams Chronicles (1976, TV Mini-Series) - Lord Carmarthen
 Clash of the Titans (1981) - Poseidon
 Sicilian Connection (1987) - (voice)
 Blind Date (1987) - Artist
 The Monster Squad (1987) - Van Helsing
 Blue Shark Hash (2001) - Jonah (final film role)

References

External links
 
 
 
 
 Obituary in The Guardian
 Farnhamians.org
 The Telegraph obit

1909 births
2001 deaths
English male film actors
English male stage actors
Male actors from Kent
People from Canterbury
Royal Navy officers
British expatriate male actors in the United States
Alumni of the Royal Central School of Speech and Drama
Military personnel from Kent
Royal Navy officers of World War II
Burials in New York (state)